or  is a Japanese dialect spoken in Kesen County, Iwate Prefecture, Japan.

Yamaura considers Kesen an independent language, related to both Japanese and Ainu languages, but this is not accepted by other linguists.

Kesen
Kesen is spoken in the Kesen district of Iwate Prefecture, in the Tōhoku region of eastern Japan. Kesen dialect has been described as a variety of the Tōhoku dialect. The status of Kesen as an independent language, rather than a dialect of Japanese, is disputed. Harutsugu Yamaura, who developed a writing system for Kesen in 1986 (see below), has argued that the form is a language.

Harutsugu Yamaura

Iwate language activist and medical doctor Harutsugu Yamaura described the dialect in various books, including a dictionary, a grammar, and a translation of the New Testament. Yamaura also created an orthography for Kesen using two writing systems, the first based on the Latin script, and the second on the Japanese writing system. Yamaura has forwarded the theory Kesen should not be considered a Japanese dialect, but an independent language in its own right with an Ainu substrate, a theory that is controversial.

According to Yamaura, Kesen was strongly influenced by the Emishi language. Yamaura considered the conventional Japanese kanji for  an ateji imposed by Yamato Kingdom. Therefore, used katakana, a writing system for foreign words, to spell the name .

Yamaura's effort to describe Kesen and restore people's pride in their local speech is an example of efforts springing up all over Japan, where the education system has resulted in the stigmatization of local dialects, which children were forbidden to use. However, such efforts are routinely depicted in the Japanese media as "romantic, bizarre or quaint". Yamaura's work has been recommended by Japanese linguists as a model to be followed for other dialects.

Further reading
Harutsugu Yamaura (1986) ケセン語入門 (Kesen-go Nyūmon, The Kesen language introduction). Kyōwa Insatsu Kikaku Center.
Harutsugu Yamaura (2000) ケセン語大辞典 (Kesen-go Daijiten, The Great Kesen Dictionary). Mumyōsha Shuppan. 
Harutsugu Yamaura (2002) ケセン語訳新約聖書(1) マタイによる福音書 (Kesen-go-yaku Shin'yaku Seisho Ichi, Matai ni Yoru Fukuinsho, The New Testament in Kesen Language (1), The Gospel of Matthew), E-Pix Shuppan. 
Harutsugu Yamaura (2004) ケセン語の世界 (Kesen-go no Sekai, The World of Kesen Language), Meiji Shoin.

References

External links
 The Great Kesen Dictionary from Mumyōsha official website.

Japanese dialects
Culture in Iwate Prefecture